Stachydeoma, common name mock pennyroyal, is a genus of flowering plant in the family Lamiaceae, first described as a genus in 1903. It contains only one known species, Stachydeoma graveolens, endemic to the State of Florida in the United States. It has been found only in the northwestern part of the state, referred to colloquially as the "Panhandle."

References

External links
Atlas of Florida Vascular Plants
Lady Bird Johnson Wildflower Center, University of Texas

Lamiaceae
Endemic flora of Florida
Monotypic Lamiaceae genera
Taxa named by Alvan Wentworth Chapman
Taxa named by Asa Gray
Taxa named by John Kunkel Small